Alluaudia is a genus of flowering plants in the family Didiereaceae. There are six species, all endemic to Madagascar.

Most occur in the southwestern subarid forest-thicket vegetation of the island.

Species of Alluaudia are dioecious, with male and female flowers on separate plants. Spines are arranged around the leaves as a defense against herbivores. The spines are several meters above the ground, and probably evolved in response to herbivory by now-extinct lemurs, such as Hadropithecus. Several lemur species living today feed heavily on Alluaudia, such as the ring-tailed lemur (Lemur catta) and the white-footed sportive lemur (Lepilemur leucopus).

Species

References

External links
GRIN Species Records of Alluaudia. Germplasm Resources Information Network (GRIN).
 http://worldofsucculents.com/how-to-grow-and-care-for-alluaudia/

Didiereaceae
Caryophyllales genera
Endemic flora of Madagascar
Dioecious plants